Hovops is a genus of Malagasy wall spiders that was first described by P. L. G. Benoit in 1968.

Species
 it contains eleven species, found on Madagascar:
Hovops antakarana Rodríguez & Corronca, 2014 – Madagascar
Hovops betsileo Corronca & Rodríguez, 2011 – Madagascar
Hovops ikongo Rodríguez & Corronca, 2014 – Madagascar
Hovops legrasi (Simon, 1887) – Madagascar
Hovops lidiae Corronca & Rodríguez, 2011 – Madagascar
Hovops madagascariensis (Vinson, 1863) – Madagascar
Hovops mariensis (Strand, 1908) – Madagascar
Hovops menabe Rodríguez & Corronca, 2014 – Madagascar
Hovops merina Corronca & Rodríguez, 2011 – Madagascar
Hovops pusillus (Simon, 1887) (type) – Madagascar
Hovops vezo Rodríguez & Corronca, 2014 – Madagascar

See also
 List of Selenopidae species

References

Araneomorphae genera
Selenopidae
Spiders of Madagascar